The Dragnet Solar Pons et al. is a collection of detective short stories by author August Derleth.  It was released in 2011 by Battered Silicon Dispatch Box.  It is a collection of Derleth's Solar Pons stories which are pastiches of the Sherlock Holmes tales of Arthur Conan Doyle.

These are the original versions of the stories as they appeared in Dragnet magazine, Detective Trails magazine, Gangster Stories magazine, and original unpublished manuscripts. Notes by Mark Wardecker compare the text of the stories to the later, anthologized versions and point out parallels to the Sherlock Holmes stories.

This collection was recommended (but not shortlisted) for a 2012 British Fantasy Award.

Contents

The Dragnet Solar Pons et al. contains the following tales:

 "Introduction", by Mark Wardecker
 "The Adventure of the Black Narcissus"
 "The Adventure of the Missing Tenants"
 "The Adventure of the Broken Chessman"
 "The Adventure of the Late Mr. Faversham"
 "The Adventure of the Limping Man"
 "Two Black Buttons"
 "The Adventure of the Red Dwarfs"
 "The Adventure of Gresham Marshes"
 "The Adventure of the Black Cardinal"
 "The Adventure of the Norcross Riddle"
 "The Adventure of the Yarpool Horror"
 "The Adventure of the Muttering Man"
 "Notes" by Mark Wardecker

References

 
 
 
 

2011 short story collections
Mystery short story collections
Sherlock Holmes pastiches
Solar Pons